Syed Amin Ashraf (10 July 1930  7 February 2013) was an Urdu Ghazal poet and critic. He earned his PhD in English Literature from Aligarh Muslim University on the topic Major Themes and Imagery in Sarogini Naidu's Poetry, and later served the same department. He produced three poetic collections and a critical compendium of essays in the form of a book. Several academic awards were conferred on his poetic anthologies, and numerous critical articles and books praised his poetic artistry.

Biography
Syed Amin Ashraf was born on 10 July 1930 in Kichhauchha Sharif, the eldest child and son of his parents. His father was Syed Habeeb Ashraf. He worked as a librarian in the village's library. He received his primary education at a local madrasa. He received a BA, an MA and a PhD degree from the Aligarh Muslim University.

Ashraf wrote three poetic collections titled, 'Jadae Shab', 'Bahare Ijaad' and 'Qafase Rang'. Barg-o-Baar is a collection of his critical papers. He received awards from Ghalib Academy, New Delhi and Uttar Pradesh Urdu Academy, Lucknow. He also served as the editor of the Aligarh Magazine during 1960's.

Ashraf died of a cardiac arrest on 7 February 2013 in Aligarh, and was buried beside his father's grave near the shrine of Ashraf Jahangir Semnani at Kichaucha Sharif.

Literary works
 Jadae Shab
 Bahare Ijaad
 Qafase Rang
 Bargo Bar

Awards and Honours received

 U.P. Urdu Academy Award on the book 'Bahare Ijaad', Lucknow(2007).
 U.P. Urdu Academy Award for contribution to Urdu Poetry, Lucknow (2010).
 Maikash Award from Maikash Academy, Aligarh (2010).
 Ghalib Award from Ghalib Academy, New Delhi (2011).
 19 Nov 2012 – 68. Sheri Nashist at the UGC ASC in honour of Dr. Syed Amin. Ashraf

References

External links
Syed Amin Ashraf at Rekhta

Academic staff of Aligarh Muslim University
People from Ambedkar Nagar district
1930 births
20th-century Indian Muslims
Urdu-language poets
Ghazal
Living people
Urdu critics